Passions, He Had Three is a 1913 American short comedy film featuring Roscoe Arbuckle and Mabel Normand.

Cast
 Roscoe 'Fatty' Arbuckle
 Beatrice Van
 Nick Cogley
 Alice Davenport
 Dot Farley
 Mabel Normand
 Betty Schade
 Al St. John

See also
 List of American films of 1913
 Fatty Arbuckle filmography

References

External links

1913 films
Silent American comedy films
1913 comedy films
1913 short films
American silent short films
American black-and-white films
Films directed by Henry Lehrman
Films produced by Mack Sennett
American comedy short films
1910s American films